Fabrizio Brignolo (born 1 December 1968 in Asti) is an Italian politician.

He is a member of the Democratic Party. He was elected Mayor of Asti on 21 May 2012 and took office on 22 May.

Brignolo served as President of the Province of Asti from October 2014 to March 2015.

See also
2012 Italian local elections
List of mayors of Oristano

References

External links
 

1968 births
Living people
Mayors of Asti
Presidents of the Province of Asti
Democratic Party (Italy) politicians